Bidwells LLP is a multi-disciplined firm of property and agribusiness consultants offering property services and consultancy in the U.K. Bidwells has 13 offices throughout the U.K, 9 of which are located in England and 4 in Scotland. Property Week ranks Bidwells in its Top 20 Property Consultants, making it the largest independent property consultancy outside London.

Key Dates for Bidwells

1800–1900
 1839  Charles Muriel Bidwell commences business in Ely.
 1866  Charles Bidwell Jnr joins the firm.
 1874  Charles Bidwell Snr dies.
 1880  Cambridge office in Mill Lane opens.

1900–1950
 1905  Charles Bidwell Jnr becomes President of the RICS.
 1920  Norman Hodgkinson becomes a Partner – The firm moves into commercial work.
 1921  Charles retires from the business and is succeeded by his two sons, John and Philip.
 1922  Charles Bidwell dies. 
 1935  Purchase of Trimley Estate for Trinity College.
 1939  Francis Pemberton joins the firm.
 1940  Francis Pemberton manages the Trimley Estate.
 1941  Francis Pemberton moves to Cambridge.

1950–2000
 1955  The firm moves to Kings Parade. 
 1968  New office opened at Trumpington.
 1976  Francis Pemberton knighted.
 1981  Tim Lawson becomes Senior Partner.
 1985  London Office opens. 
 1987  Jas W. King acquired at Perth.
 1988  Stone Cross Office opens.
 1989  John Tweddle becomes Senior Partner. Norwich Office opens.
 1990  Ipswich Office opens.
 1992  Inverness Office opens.
 1994  James Buxton becomes Managing Partner.
 1995  Anthony Hart becomes Managing Partner in Scotland. Northampton Office opens.
 1999  The Professional Services Division is formed. London Office moves to Pollen Street. Partnership Structure is changed.

2000–2010
 2000  James Buxton becomes Senior Partner. West Highlands Estates Office joins Bidwells
 2003  Acquisition of Drake and Partners Opening of Milton Keynes Office
 2004  Acquisition of Carpenter Planning Consultancy New offices open in Chelmsford and Saffron Walden
 2005  Acquisition of TCC Architects & Bret Hallworth & Co Ltd
 2008  Acquisition of rural surveying practice Faulkners. Building Consultancy win two highly commended David Urwin Awards
 2009  Bidwells convert to Limited Liability Partnership (LLP).
 2010  Patrick McMahon takes over as Senior Partner. Finlay Clark takes over as Managing Partner of Scotland.

2011–current
 2011 Milton Keynes Office moves to John Ormond House. Oxford Office opens. Sir Francis Pemberton dies at 95. Sir Francis had a huge influence on the early years of Bidwells including working with Trinity College on the creation of the Cambridge Science Park.
 2022 Nick Pettit takes over as Senior Partner. Finlay Clark takes over as Deputy Managing Partner.

Services
Investment & Acquisitions
Sales, Letting
Consultancy
Residential, Commercial & Rural
Property & Estate Management
Valuation
Fund Management
Building Consultancy
Planning Services
Environmental Impact Assessment (EIA) Services
Agribusiness Consultancy

See also
Strutt & Parker
King Sturge
Savills
Knight Frank
Carter Jonas

References

Companies established in 1839
Property services companies of the United Kingdom